The Albanian Volleyball Cup is the top annual national men's volleyball cup competition in Albania. It was founded in 1954 by the Albanian Basketball Association and the club with the most titles is Dinamo, who have won the competition on 18 occasions.

Title holders

 1954 Partizani
 1956 Dinamo
 1957 Spartaku
 1958 17 Nëntori
 1960 Partizani
 1961 Dinamo
 1962 Dinamo
 1963 Partizani
 1964 17 Nëntori
 1965 Dinamo
 1966 Dajti
 1967 Dinamo
 1968 Dinamo
 1968–69 Vllaznia
 1969–70 Vllaznia
 1970–71 Partizani
 1971–72 Dinamo
 1972–73 Vllaznia
 1973–74 Partizani
 1974–75 Dinamo
 1975–76 Dinamo
 1976–77 Partizani
 1977–78 Dinamo (*)
 1978–79 Dinamo
 1979–80 Dinamo
 1980–81 Dinamo
 1981–82 Partizani
 1982–83 Dinamo
 1983–84 Dinamo
 1984–85 Vllaznia
 1985–86 Dinamo
 1986–87 17 Nëntori
 1987–88 Vllaznia
 1988–89 Vllaznia
 1989–90 Dinamo
 1990–91 17 Nëntori
 1991–92 Tirana
 1992–93 Partizani
 1993–94 Partizani
 1994–95 Studenti
 1995–96 Tirana
 1996–97 Studenti
 1997–98 Erzeni
 1998–99 Erzeni
 1999–00 Teuta
 2000–01 Studenti
 2001–02 Studenti
 2002–03 Dinamo
 2003–04 Studenti
 2004–05 Studenti
 2005–06 Studenti
 2006–07 Studenti
 2007–08 Studenti
 2008–09 Teuta
 2009–10 Studenti (*)
 2010–11 Studenti
 2011–12 Studenti
 2012–13 Studenti
 2013–14 Studenti
 2014–15 Studenti
 2015–16 Studenti
 2016–17 Partizani (*)
 2017–18 Partizani
 2018–19 Erzeni
 2019–20 Partizani
 2020–21 Partizani
 2021–22 Tirana
 2022–23 Tirana

Performance by club

References

External links 
FSHV official website

See also
 Albanian Volleyball League
 Albanian Volleyball Supercup
 Nationwide Volleyball Supercup

 

 
Volleyball in Albania